Espelkamp is a town in the Minden-Lübbecke district, in North Rhine-Westphalia, Germany.

Geography
Espelkamp is situated approximately 10 kilometers north of Lübbecke and 20 kilometers north-west of Minden.

Neighbouring places

Town subdivisions 
After the local government reforms of 1973 Espelkamp consists of 9 districts:

Twin towns – sister cities

Espelkamp is twinned with:
 Angermünde, Germany
 Borås, Sweden
 Nagykőrös, Hungary
 Torgelow, Germany

References

External links

 Official site 

Minden-Lübbecke